Rescuers can mean:

General topics
 rescuers, people who perform rescues
 rescue services
 rescue squad
 Rescuer (genocide)

See also

 
 
 The Rescue (disambiguation)
 The Rescuers (disambiguation)
 Rescue (disambiguation)